Inés de Suárez is an underground metro station on the Line 6 of the Santiago Metro, in Santiago, Chile. This station is named for Inés de Suárez, a woman from Extremadura who was a companion and a one-time lover of the conqueror Pedro de Valdivia, who took an important part of the control in the defense of the city of Santiago against the indigenous resistance. A short distance from the station is the Inés de Suarez Park and the Plaza Pedro de Valdivia. The station was opened on 2 November 2017 as part of the inaugural section of the line, between Cerrillos and Los Leones.

References

Santiago Metro stations
2017 establishments in Chile
Santiago Metro Line 6